Arnold Scholten (born 5 December 1962) is a Dutch football coach and former player who works as youth coach at Feyenoord. He played as a midfielder for Den Bosch, Ajax, Feyenoord and JEF United Ichihara (Japan). Because of his white-blonde haircolor, Scholten was nicknamed The White Socrates after Brazilian playmaker Sócrates.

Career statistics

Honours 
Ajax
Eredivisie: 1989–90, 1995–96
KNVB Cup: 1986–87
UEFA Cup Winners' Cup: 1986–87
Johan Cruijff Schaal: 1995
UEFA Super Cup: 1995
Intercontinental Cup: 1995

Feyenoord
Eredivisie: 1992–93
KNVB Cup: 1990–91, 1991–92, 1993–94, 1994–95
Johan Cruijff Schaal: 1991

Den Bosch
Eerste Divisie: 1998–99, 2000–01

References

External links
  Profile

1962 births
Living people
Sportspeople from 's-Hertogenbosch
Dutch footballers
Association football midfielders
FC Den Bosch players
AFC Ajax players
Feyenoord players
JEF United Chiba players
Eredivisie players
Eerste Divisie players
J1 League players
Dutch expatriate footballers
Dutch expatriate sportspeople in Japan
Expatriate footballers in Japan
Footballers from North Brabant